Kevin D. Miller is an American politician and law enforcement officer who was appointed to serve as a member of the Ohio House of Representatives from the 72nd district. Miller has previously worked as a commander with the Ohio State Highway Patrol.

Education 
Miller earned a Bachelor of Science degree from Ohio State University in 1997.

Career 
Miller has served as a member of the Ohio State Highway Patrol for 22 years, including as a commander, labor relations advocate, and trooper. He most recently served as the Highway Patrol's legislative liaison. On June 25, 2021, it was announced that Miller would replace former Speaker Larry Householder in the Ohio House of Representatives after Householder was expelled from the house on June 16, 2021.

References 

Living people
Republican Party members of the Ohio House of Representatives
Ohio State University alumni
People from Newark, Ohio
Year of birth missing (living people)